Prokuplje is a city and the administrative center of the Toplica District in southern Serbia. As of 2022 census, the municipality has a population of 38,291 inhabitants.

Prokuplje is one of the Roman sites of Serbia. The town was known as Ürgüp during Ottoman rule and was incorporated into the Kingdom of Serbia in 1878.

Geography
The Toplica district is located in southern Serbia, in the central part of Balkan peninsula. 

Prokuplje is located between municipalities of Blace, Kuršumlija, Bojnik, Žitorađa, Merošina, Aleksinac, and Kruševac.

Climate
Prokuplje has an hot-summer mediterranean climate (Köppen climate classification: Csa) that's close to a humid subtropical climate (Köppen climate classification: Cfa).

History and archaeology

Neolithic and Copper Age

Together with Belovode, Pločnik is one of two Vinča culture sites from Serbia considered (as of 2014) the worldwide earliest to produce evidence of copper smelting. The occupation periods are between c. 5350-4650 BC for Belovode and 5200-4650 BC for Pločnik, making Pločnik the second-oldest copper smelting site so far discovered anywhere in the world. There are two theories about the emergence of metalworking: the smelting technology was either discovered in one region only, at or near the Fertile Crescent in what is now southern Iran and emanated from there around the world, or it happened independently in different places, the Vinča culture area of Serbia and Bulgaria being one of them, and for now the oldest to be researched and dated. In October 2008, Serbian archaeologists at Pločnik found a copper axe believed to be 7,500 years old, making it 500–800 years older than what had previously been considered to be the beginning of the Copper Age and suggesting that the human use of metal is older than previously believed.

Classical antiquity
The agricultural Vinča settlements were replaced by the emerging Thracians and then the invading Celtic Scordisci in 279 BC. Pieces of ceramics found by the Latin Church are traces of those tribes' movement on their way to Greece.

Between 73 and 75 BC, after the Romans subjugated the tribes of the region, this part of Serbia became a part of the Roman province of Moesia. At the time  the settlement was known as Hammeum or Hameo, its oldest preserved name. It was located on the Roman Via Militaris, a road that connected the central Balkans with the Adriatic, passing through nearby Naissus (Niš). In July 2008 a major Roman spa was unearthed.

At the end of the 4th century AD, when the Roman Empire was divided, the Toplica region became part of the Eastern Roman or Byzantine Empire. The place became known as Komplos or Komblos (village-town). Some historians believe that Komplos was rebuilt by Emperor Justinian (r. 527–565).

Middle Ages 
When South Serbs first settled in this area in the 6th century, the city was known as Komplos.

During the 9th-11th centuries and the 13th century the territory of modern-day Prokuplje was part of the Bulgarian Empire. 

The city is named after the "Fortress of St. Procopios", first mentioned in 1395. The Ottomans seized the city during their conquest of Serbia, but had to return it in 1444 following the Peace of Szeged.

Ottoman rule

15th-17th centuries
In 1454, Prokuplje was besieged by the Ottomans and during the next 423 years of Ottomans rule the name of the place was Urcub or Okrub. It was part of the Sanjak of Niš.

During the Ottoman rule, in the period between the 16th and 17th centuries, the town's importance increased, similarly to other towns in the region, such as Kruševac, Stalac and Leskovac. Prokuplje prospered through the trade connections with Dubrovnik.

1689-1878: wars and ethnic changes
During the Great Turkish War (1683-1699), there was a massive local rebellion of Christian Serbs in support of the Austrian troops who were advancing in the area. Prokuplje was captured by Austrian troops and Serbian Militia in 1689, but after the Ottoman counter-offensive, the town was burned down during the Austrian retreat of 1690, in spite of Habsburg colonel Antonije Znorić's orders to the contrary. Serbs, who had supported the Austrian troops, after their withdrawal started increasingly emigrating from the area, while there was an increase of Muslim Albanian migration into the town.

Toponyms such as Arbanaška and Đjake shows an Albanian presence in the Toplica and Southern Morava regions (located north-east of contemporary Kosovo) that dates to the medieval era. The rural parts of Toplica valley and adjoining semi-mountainous interior was inhabited  during Ottoman rule by compact Muslim Albanian population, while Serbs in those areas lived near the river mouths and mountain slopes; both peoples inhabited other regions of the South Morava river basin. The Toplica region had an Albanian majority and so did the town of Prokuplje.

During the 1877–1878 period, these Albanians were expelled by Serbian forces in a way that today would be characterized as ethnic cleansing. A report was made by local authorities in early 1878 for the minister of education at the time, Alimpje Vasiljević. There were 131 villages, with 1,485 Serbian homes and 1,553 Muslim homes. 12 villages were unregistered as snowfall made them inaccessible, but the inhabitants of these abandoned villages were previously all Albanian. Therefore, the number of houses in regards to the villages only accounts for 119 villages. It is estimated that around 11,437 Albanians left their homes in 119 villages in the Prokuplje district with the arrival of the Serbian army.

Modern Serbia and Yugoslavia (1877-)
In 1877, the entire Toplica region was captured from the Ottomans by Serbian forces, with Prokuplje changing hands on 19 December 1877. The Berlin Congress of 1878 recognised the city and the wider area as part of Serbia.

From 1929 to 1941, Prokuplje was part of the Morava Banovina of the Kingdom of Yugoslavia. During the First and Second World War Prokuplje was completely destroyed, but in the post-war period it became an industrial town.

In June 2018, Prokuplje gained the status of a city, along with Bor.

Demographics

According to the official census done in 2011, the city of Prokuplje has 44,419 inhabitants. A total of 61.5% of its population is living in urban areas. As of 2022 census, the municipality has a population of 38,291 inhabitants. Prokuplje has 14,814 households with 3,00 members on average, while the number of homes is 22,898.

Religion structure in Prokuplje is predominantly Serbian Orthodox (41,494), with minorities like Muslims (289), Atheists (122), Catholics (76) and others. Most of the population speaks Serbian language (41,764).

The composition of population by sex and average age:
 Male - 22,056 (40.90 years) and
 Female - 22,363 (43.65 years).

A total of 17,777 citizens (older than 15 years) have secondary education (47.1%), while the 5,002 citizens have higher education (13.3%). Of those with higher education, 2,700 (7.2%) have university education.

Ethnic groups
Most of Prokuplje's population is of Serb ethnicity (92.16%). The ethnic composition of the city:

Economy
Prokuplje has a weak economy, with most of the employed people working in public sector. In 2009, Leoni Wiring Systems Southeast opened a factory in Prokuplje, employing around 1,750 people as of 2013.

The following table gives a preview of total number of registered people employed in legal entities per their core activity (as of 2018):

Gallery

International relations

Twin towns – Sister cities
Prokuplje is twinned with:
 Yverdon-les-Bains, Switzerland
 Hemnes, Norway
 Montauban, France

See also
 List of cities in Serbia

References

External links

 

 
Populated places in Toplica District
Municipalities and cities of Southern and Eastern Serbia
Roman sites in Serbia